Movima is a language that is spoken by about 1,400 (nearly half) of the Movima, a group of Native Americans that resides in the Llanos de Moxos region of the Bolivian Amazon, in northeastern Bolivia. It is considered a language isolate, as it has not been proven to be related to any other language.

Locations
Movima is spoken in the locations of 18 de Noviembre, 20 de Enero, Bella Flor, Buen Día, Carmen de Iruyañez, Carnavales, Ipimo, Miraflores, Navidad, San Lorenzo, Santa Ana del Yacuma.

Phonology
Movima has five vowels:

Vowels have a phonemic length distinction, although some prosodic processes can lengthen otherwise short vowels. Movima does not have tone.

In vowel-initial words and between adjacent vowels, an epenthetic glottal stop appears.

Morphology
In Movima, compounding and incorporation are productive derivational processes. Reduplication and affixation, including some processes (such as the irrealis marker (k)a''') that resemble infixation, are also common. Typical examples of inflection, such as number, case, tense, mood, and aspect, are not obligatorily marked in Movima. Many derivational processes can be applied to a single Movima word. The same morpheme may appear multiple times in one word this way, for instance, tikoy-na-poj-na'' "I make X kill Y."

Vocabulary
Loukotka (1968) lists the following basic vocabulary items.

{| class="wikitable sortable"
! gloss !! Movima
|-
| one || sotaru
|-
| two || oira
|-
| three || taxra
|-
| tooth || söichlan
|-
| tongue || rulkua
|-
| hand || chopa
|-
| woman || kukya
|-
| water || tomi
|-
| fire || vé
|-
| moon || yekcho
|-
| maize || kuaxta
|-
| jaguar || rulrul
|-
| house || roya
|}

Further vocabulary:

{| class="wikitable sortable"
! gloss !! Movima
|-
| to sit || as
|-
| to stand || en
|-
| to come || jiwa
|-
| dust || vuskwa
|-
| Movima || mowi:maj
|-
| language || chonsineɬ
|-
| of || di'
|}

See also
Llanos de Moxos (archaeology)

Further reading
Judy, R. A.; Judy, J. (1962). Movima y castellano. (Vocabularios Bolivianos, 1). Vocabularios Bolivianos. Cochabamba: Summer Institute of Linguistics.

References

External links
World Atlas of Language Structures information on Movima
 Lenguas de Bolivia (online edition)
 Movima (Intercontinental Dictionary Series)
 Movima DoReCo corpus compiled by Katharina Haude. Audio recordings of narrative texts with transcriptions time-aligned at the phone level, translations, and time-aligned morphological annotations.

Language isolates of South America
Languages of Bolivia
Mamoré–Guaporé linguistic area